Catherine Ingrid Guinness, known as Catherine Charteris, Lady Neidpath from 1983 to 1990 and later as Catherine Hesketh, (born 1 June 1952) is a British aristocrat, writer, and socialite. The first child of Jonathan Guinness, 3rd Baron Moyne, she is a member of the prominent Guinness family and a granddaughter of Diana Mitford. Guinness was a close friend of Andy Warhol, for whom she worked as a personal assistant in New York, and was active in the New York social scene and The Factory.

Early life and family 
The Honourable Catherine Ingrid Guinness was born on 1 June 1952 in Oxford to Jonathan Bryan Guinness, 3rd Baron Moyne and Ingrid Georgia Olivia Wyndham. Her father was a member of the Guinness family, a wealthy and politically prominent Irish family that made a fortune from brewing and banking. Her mother was a member of the Wyndham family and a descendant of George Wyndham, 1st Baron Leconfield. Her paternal grandparents were the poet and novelist Bryan Guinness, 2nd Baron Moyne and the socialite Diana Mitford, who was one of the infamous Mitford sisters. Her maternal grandparents were Major Guy Richard Charles Wyndham MC, the son of Lieutenant-Colonel Guy Wyndham, and Grethe Wulfsberg, a Norwegian woman. Guinness' parents divorced in 1963, after which her mother remarried Lord Moyne's cousin, Henry Paul Guinness Channon, Baron Kelvedon.

She is the half sister of Daphne Guinness, who lived with her in New York in the early 1980s.

Adult life 
Guinness was photographed by Robert Mapplethorpe in 1976. The Mapplethorpe photograph is now owned by the J. Paul Getty Museum. Another photograph of Guinness, taken by Mappelthorpe, is in the collection of the Los Angeles County Museum of Art.

She married James Donald Charteris, Lord Neidpath, the son and heir of David Charteris, 12th Earl of Wemyss, in July 1983. Guinness and her husband lived at Stanway House, the Charteris family's 17th-century manor in Gloucestershire. They have two children: Francis Richard Charteris, Lord Elcho and Lady Mary Charteris Lord and Lady Neidpath divorced in 1988.

In 1990, Guinness married a second time, to Robert Fleetwood Hesketh, a relative of the Baron Hesketh. They had three children. Her husband died from a drug overdose in 2004. Her husband's 1,600-acre estate in Churchtown was inherited by their son, Frank.

Guinness worked as a personal assistant for her friend Andy Warhol. As a close associate with Warhol, she was active in The Factory and New York's social scene. She was also a close friend of Charles, Prince of Wales, and active in the London social scene. In 1979, Guinness appeared alongside Warhol in the film Cocaine Cowboys.

In 1984 she co-wrote the book The House of Mitford with her father.

References 

Living people
1952 births
British courtesy baronesses and ladies of Parliament
British people of Norwegian descent
British socialites
Clan Charteris
Daughters of barons
Catherine
People associated with The Factory